Sancellemoz is a sanatorium in the town of Passy, in Haute-Savoie, eastern France. Professor Marie Curie died in the sanatorium Sancellemoz.

External links
Sancellemoz

Hospitals in Haute-Savoie
Hospitals with year of establishment missing